Amor Towles (born 1964) is an American novelist. He is best known for his bestselling novels Rules of Civility (2011), A Gentleman in Moscow (2016), and The Lincoln Highway (2021).

Early life and education 
Towles was born and raised in Boston, Massachusetts. He graduated from Yale College and received an M.A. in English from Stanford University, where he was a Scowcroft Fellow.  When Towles was 10 years old, he threw a bottle with a message into the Atlantic Ocean.  Several weeks later, he received a letter from Harrison Salisbury, who was then the managing editor of The New York Times.  Towles and Salisbury corresponded for many years afterward.

Career 
After graduating from Yale University, Towles was set to teach in China on a two-year fellowship from the Yale China Association.  However, this was abruptly canceled due to the Tiananmen Square crackdown in 1989.

From 1991–2012, he worked as an investment manager and director of research at Select Equity Group in New York.

When Towles was a young man, he credited Peter Matthiessen, renowned nature writer, novelist, and one of the founders of The Paris Review, as the primary inspiration for writing novels. Towles' first novel, Rules of Civility, was successful beyond his expectations, so much so that proceeds from the book afforded him the luxury of retirement from investment banking and the opportunity to pursue writing full time. 

His second novel, A Gentleman in Moscow, which was on the New York Times hardcover bestseller list for 59 weeks, was a finalist for the 2016 Kirkus Prize for Fiction. It was also longlisted for the 2018 International Dublin Literary Award. A television series based on the novel and starring Ewan McGregor is scheduled to begin production in late 2022. 

Towles' third novel, The Lincoln Highway, was published on October 5, 2021. It was chosen by Amazon as the best book of 2021. As of May 15, 2022, it had been on the New York Times hardcover fiction bestseller list for 30 weeks.

Personal life
Towles resides in Gramercy Park, Manhattan, New York City, with his wife Maggie, their son Stokley, and their daughter Esmé. Towles is a collector of fine art and antiques.

Awards and honors 
 2016 Finalist for the Kirkus Prize for Fiction

Works

Fiction

Essays
 "Channel a More Romantic Era of Transatlantic Travel" (2016)

References

External links
Amor Towles official author website

1964 births
Living people
21st-century American novelists
American male novelists
People from Gramercy Park
Writers from Boston
Yale College alumni
Stanford University alumni
21st-century American male writers
Novelists from New York (state)
Novelists from Massachusetts